The 1991 Chico State Wildcats football team represented California State University, Chico as a member of the Northern California Athletic Conference (NCAC) during the 1991 NCAA Division II football season. Led by third-year head coach Gary Hauser, Chico State compiled an overall record of 4–6 with a mark of 2–3 in conference play, placing in a three-way tie for third in the NCAC. The team was outscored by its opponents 300 to 243 for the season. The Wildcats played home games at University Stadium in Chico, California.

Schedule

References

Chico State
Chico State Wildcats football seasons
Chico State Wildcats football